Executive Order 13989, officially titled Ethic Commitments by Executive Branch Personnel, was signed on January 20, 2021, and is the fifth executive order signed by U.S. President Joe Biden. The order works to guarantee that the Executive Branch makes ethical commitments.

Provisions 
This order declares that each appointee shall sign, and contractually agree upon, the following commitment upon his or her nomination in any executive agency appointed on or after January 20, 2021. It states, ”I recognize that this pledge is part of a broader ethics in government plan designed to restore and maintain public trust in government, and I commit myself to conduct consistent with that plan. I commit to decision-making on the merits and exclusively in the public interest, without regard to private gain or personal benefit. I commit to conduct that upholds the independence of law enforcement and precludes improper interference with investigative or prosecutorial decisions of the Department of Justice. I commit to ethical choices of post-Government employment that do not raise the appearance that I have used my Government service for private gain, including by using confidential information acquired and relationships established for the benefit of future clients.”

Effects 
The order aims to ensure that those in the Executive Branch will not accept bribes from lobbyists, engage in activities with a former employer, communicate with outsiders about the work they do, accept money from a former employer, and that they make hirings based on a person's qualifications, with the goal of restoring and maintaining public trust in the government.

See also 
 List of executive actions by Joe Biden
2020 United States census

References

External links 
 US Presidential Actions
 Federal Register
Executive Order on Ensuring a Lawful and Accurate Enumeration and Apportionment Pursuant to the Decennial Census

2021 in American law
Executive orders of Joe Biden
January 2021 events in the United States